Perry Pearn (born June 6, 1951) is a Canadian professional ice hockey coach. He is a former assistant coach in the National Hockey League, most recently with the Vancouver Canucks. In 2022, he became the head coach of the Japanese national ice hockey team.

Coaching career
Pearn, a native of Stettler, Alberta, was an assistant with the original incarnation of the Winnipeg Jets (1995–1996), Ottawa Senators (1996–2004), New York Rangers (2004–2009), Montreal Canadiens (2009–2011) and the current Jets (2012–2014). On August 11, 2014 he was hired as an assistant coach by the Vancouver Canucks. At the end of the 2016–2017 regular season, he was let go in the dismissal of head coach Willie Desjardins and fellow assistant Doug Lidster.

Pearn has also coached at the university and junior levels, including one season as head coach of the Medicine Hat Tigers of the Western Hockey League.

Pearn served twice as an assistant coach with Canada's national junior team at the IIHF World Junior Championships (1990, 1991).  As head coach, he led Canada to gold in 1993.

During the summers, Pearn runs elite-level hockey camps in Alberta for professional and major junior players.

Pearn has been inducted into four halls of fame—the Edmonton Sports Hall of Fame (1995), the Alberta Colleges Athletic Conference Hall of Fame (2014), the Alberta Hockey Hall of Fame (2017) and the Canadian Colleges Athletic Association Hall of Fame (2019).

In November 2022, Pearn became head coach of the Japan men's national ice hockey team and the Japan men's national junior ice hockey team.

References

External links

Winnipeg Jets profile
Coach Perry Pearn on the 84/85 NAIT Ooks perfect hockey season

1951 births
Living people
Canadian expatriate ice hockey people
Canadian expatriate sportspeople in the United States
Canadian ice hockey coaches
Ice hockey people from Alberta
Medicine Hat Tigers coaches
Montreal Canadiens coaches
New York Rangers coaches
Ottawa Senators coaches
People from the County of Stettler No. 6
Vancouver Canucks coaches
Winnipeg Jets (1972–1996) coaches
Winnipeg Jets coaches